Brian Harvey (born 1974) is a British pop and dance music singer.

Brian or Bryan Harvey may also refer to:

Brian Harvey (athlete) (born 1965), Australian paralympic athlete
Bryan Harvey (born 1963), baseball player
Bryan Harvey (musician) (1956–2006), American musician with House of Freaks
Brian Harvey (lecturer) (born 1949), computer programmer and lecturer at Berkeley
Brian Harvey (footballer, born 1947), English association footballer
Brian Harvey (Australian rules footballer) (born 1949), Australian rules footballer
Brian Harvey (author) (born 1953), Irish space-history author
Brian Harvey (priest) (1916–2005), Dean of Ossory
Brian Harvey, ex-drummer of Virginia grindcore band Pig Destroyer